Deutsche Post v Commission (2011) C-463/10P is an EU law case, concerning judicial review in the European Union.

Facts
Deutsche Post and Germany claimed annulment of an order by the General Court, which declared inadmissible their actions for annulment of a Commission decision to require Germany provide information on state aid to Deutsche Post. TFEU article 108 required member states to notify the Commission of plans to grant new aid, and to give all necessary information. In 2008 the Commission sent a questionnaire on DP's revenue and costs, and a reminder letter. Germany replied that it would be disproportionate in time and work to give the information after 1994. The Commission said the information had to be given in 20 days. Deutsche Post and Germany brought an action for annulment and the Commission argued it was not an 'act', and this was upheld by the General Court. It said that an injunction for information had no sanction, so was not an 'act' open to challenge.

Judgment
The Third Chamber held that the Commission had done an act, and therefore an action for annulment could be brought. It produced independent legal effects.

See also

European Union law

Notes

References

Court of Justice of the European Union case law